In 1955, Billboard magazine published three charts specifically covering the top-performing songs in the United States in rhythm and blues and related African-American-oriented music genres.  The Best Sellers in Stores chart ranked records based on their "current national selling importance at the retail level", based on a survey of record retailers "with a high volume of sales in rhythm and blues records".  The Most Played in Juke Boxes listing was based on "plays in juke boxes thruout  the country" derived from a survey of "operators using a high proportion of rhythm and blues records".  The Most Played by Jockeys chart, which was first published in the issue dated January 22, ranked songs based on the "number of plays on disk jockey radio shows" according to a weekly survey of "top disk jockey shows in all key markets".  The three charts are considered part of the lineage of the magazine's multimetric R&B chart launched in 1958, which since 2005 has been published under the title Hot R&B/Hip Hop Songs.

In the issue of Billboard dated January 1, "You Upset Me Baby" by B.B. King was at number one on the juke box chart and "Hearts of Stone" by the Charms held the top spot on the best sellers listing; the latter song became the first chart-topper on the jockeys chart when it was first published three weeks later.  "Hearts of Stone" was among four of 1955's R&B number one songs which were also chart-toppers on Billboards pop music charts, but in each case a different artist took the song to the top of the pop listings.   At the time it was difficult for black acts to achieve sufficient crossover popularity to top the pop charts, and it was common for white acts to record cover versions of R&B songs for the mainstream market.  Shortly after the Charms topped all three charts, Johnny Ace achieved the same feat with "Pledging My Love"; it was the third and final chart-topper for the singer, who had died the previous December at the age of 25.

The year's longest-running number one on both the juke box and jockeys charts was "Maybellene", the first chart-topper for Chuck Berry.  The song is regarded as pivotal in the development of the emerging rock and roll genre; it was included on the Rock and Roll Hall of Fame's list of the "500 Songs That Shaped Rock and Roll", and Rolling Stones 2021 list of the 500 Greatest Songs of All Time.  The longest-running number one on the best sellers chart was "Ain't That a Shame" by Fats Domino, another pioneer of rock and roll.  The song was listed on the charts as "Ain't It a Shame" because the title was printed incorrectly on the single.  The year's final number one on the best sellers listing was "Hands Off" by Priscilla Bowman with Jay McShann and his Orchestra.  Despite selling sufficiently in the rhythm and blues market to top this chart, the song did not enter Billboards pop charts at all; not until 1976 would another R&B chart-topper fail to reach even the lowest position of the pop listing.

Chart history
Beginning with the April 9 issue, Billboard sometimes listed both sides of a single jointly at number one on the Best Sellers and Juke Box charts, based on a methodology which combined the survey data for both songs if "significant action [was] reported on both sides of a record".  This does not indicate that the single was officially released or promoted as a double A-side.

Notes
a.  Listed on the chart as "Ain't It a Shame"
b.  Both sides listed jointly at number one

References

Works cited

1955
1955 record charts
1955 in American music